Closed Door may refer to:
 Closed Door (1962 film), an Argentine film
 Closed Door (1939 film), an Argentine drama film

See also
 Closed Doors, a 1921 American silent drama film